The Saint John Paul II National Shrine is a national shrine in Washington, D.C., sponsored by the Knights of Columbus. It is a place of prayer for Catholics and welcomes people of all faiths. The Shrine houses a permanent exhibit called A Gift of Love: the Life of Saint John Paul II and is home to the Redemptor Hominis Church and Luminous Mysteries Chapel, both of which are decorated with mosaic art designed by Rev. Marko Rupnik, S.J.  Mass is celebrated daily in the Redemptor Hominis Church, and the Luminous Mysteries Chapel houses a first-class relic of John Paul II.

The  building is built on 12 acres (4.9 ha) adjacent to The Catholic University of America and the Basilica of the National Shrine of the Immaculate Conception in the Brookland neighborhood of Northeast Washington.

History

Although they are two separate projects, the building which now is the Saint John Paul II National Shrine historically housed the Pope John Paul II Cultural Center. The idea for the center originated at a meeting in 1989 between Pope John Paul II and then-Bishop Adam Maida, the Bishop of Green Bay. Maida had proposed an institution similar to a U.S. presidential library be built in honor of the pope; the pope instead suggested a center for exploring interfaith issues. The cultural center was envisioned as a museum and Catholic think tank which would explore the intersection of faith and culture through interactive displays, academic discussion and research, and museum exhibits.

In 1990 Maida was appointed Archbishop of Detroit, and he set to work raising funds. About $50 million was raised from several thousand donors. The Archdiocese lent $17 million directly to the center and also guaranteed its $23 million mortgage. Construction of the complex cost $75 million. The center was opened to the public in a ceremony in March 2001, attended by President George W. Bush, several cardinals, members of Congress and other dignitaries.

While academic discussions and special events were successful, the Center nonetheless struggled during a slow economy and a drop in tourism to Washington following the September 11 terrorist attacks.

The center eventually closed except by appointment, and in 2009, after Cardinal Maida's retirement, the Center was put up for sale. In 2010, the Dominican Sisters of Mary, Mother of the Eucharist indicated a desire to purchase the building for a house of studies, but eventually determined not to acquire the property.

The Knights of Columbus management 
On August 2, 2011, Carl Anderson, Supreme Knight of the Knights of Columbus, announced that the Catholic lay family organization would purchase the Cultural Center with the intention of transforming it into a religious shrine dedicated to the memory of then-Blessed John Paul II.  Cardinal Donald Wuerl, the Archbishop of Washington, immediately declared the facility a diocesan shrine. The Knights paid $22.7 million, of which $2.7 million went to the Catholic University of America and $20 million to the Archdiocese of Detroit 

From the beginning of the Knights of Columbus’ sponsorship of the Shrine, Mass was celebrated on a nearly daily basis at the Shrine and a simple temporary exhibit on John Paul II was made available to the public.

Over the following 5 years, the Knights of Columbus undertook massive renovations to the facility including the construction of a 16,000 sq. ft. exhibit on the life and legacy of John Paul II and the development of two liturgical spaces on the main floor of the Shrine.

On April 14, 2014, the day of John Paul II’s canonization by Pope Francis, the shrine was elevated to the status of a national shrine pursuant to a vote of the Administrative Committee of the U.S. Conference of Catholic Bishops and renamed the Saint John Paul II National Shrine.

References

External links
Saint John Paul II National Shrine

Brookland (Washington, D.C.)
Buildings at the Catholic University of America
History museums in Washington, D.C.
Knights of Columbus
Museums established in 2001
Cultural Center
Religious museums in Washington, D.C.
Catholic Church in Washington, D.C.
Think tanks established in 2001
2001 establishments in Washington, D.C.
Biographical museums in Washington, D.C.